Contractor is a surname. Notable people with the name include:

Behram Contractor (1930–2001), Indian journalist
Didi Contractor (1929–2021), German-American architect
Dinyar Contractor (born 1946), Indian actor and comedian
Hafeez Contractor (born 1950), Indian architect
Nari Contractor (born 1934), Indian cricketer
Nazneen Contractor (born 1982), Canadian actress
Noshir Contractor (born 1959), American professor of behavioral science
Soli Contractor (born 1938), Indian contractor